Glendale is an unincorporated community in Pope County, Illinois, United States.

References

Unincorporated communities in Pope County, Illinois
Unincorporated communities in Illinois